Goodspring is an unincorporated community in Giles County, Tennessee, United States. Its ZIP code is 38460.

Notes

Unincorporated communities in Giles County, Tennessee
Unincorporated communities in Tennessee